Roy Ambler (2 December 1937 – 5 May 2007) was an English footballer who played for Leeds United, Shrewsbury Town, Wrexham, York City, Southport and Matlock Town.

References

1937 births
2007 deaths
Footballers from Wakefield
English footballers
Association football forwards
Leeds United F.C. players
Shrewsbury Town F.C. players
Wrexham A.F.C. players
York City F.C. players
Southport F.C. players
Matlock Town F.C. players
English Football League players